Simon Chang  is a women's fashion designer, currently residing in Montreal, Quebec, Canada. In 2008, the designer was honored by Governor General Michaëlle Jean with the Order of Canada "for his contributions to the fashion industry as well as for his philanthropic and social engagement".


Biography

Of Chinese descent, Simon was raised in Vancouver, British Columbia. He attended Emily Carr University of Art and Design on a full scholarship awarded by The Hudson’s Bay Company.

After deciding to pursue a career in women's fashion, Simon Chang completed over 300 women's wear collections, from eyewear, to bathing suits, to uniforms.

References

External links
 
Simon Chang in the Fashion Model Directory

1947 births
Living people
Members of the Order of Canada
Canadian fashion designers
People from Vancouver
People from Montreal
Emily Carr University of Art and Design alumni